Villa Park is a Metra commuter railroad station in Villa Park, Illinois, a western suburb of Chicago. Trains go east to Ogilvie Transportation Center in Chicago and as far west as Elburn, Illinois. Travel time to Ogilvie ranges from 43 minutes on local trains to 31 minutes on express trains, with faster times during peak hours. , Villa Park is the 59th busiest of the 236 non-downtown stations in the Metra system, with an average of 870 weekday boardings. Unless otherwise announced, inbound trains (except inbound train no. 38) use the north platform and outbound trains (and train no. 38) use the south platform.

As of December 5, 2022, Villa Park is served by 52 trains (27 inbound, 25 outbound) on weekdays, by all 10 trains in each direction on Saturdays, and by all nine trains in each direction on Sundays and holidays.

The station is on ground level, at North Ardmore Avenue and West Terrace Street, with parking lots north and south of the tracks. Villa Park's commercial district is centered on Ardmore Ave. and Saint Charles Road, several blocks south of the station. Another Villa Avenue station, which was built by the Chicago, Aurora, and Elgin Railroad in 1929, has been on the National Register of Historic Places since 1986.

Due to the relatively close proximity to Proviso Yard, Metra trains occasionally must use the middle track to avoid the frequent freight traffic. Because the middle track has no platform, the train's cab car receives and discharges passengers at the Ardmore Avenue railroad crossing when this does occur.

References

External links

Villa Park Historical Society Museum — historical photos
Station from Ardmore Avenue from Google Maps Street View

Metra stations in Illinois
Former Chicago and North Western Railway stations
Railway stations in DuPage County, Illinois
Villa Park, Illinois
1908 establishments in Illinois
Railway stations in the United States opened in 1908
Union Pacific West Line